Cesare Nay (October 22, 1925 – August 8, 1994) was an Italian professional football player. He was born and died in Turin.

External links
 Cesare Nay's obituary 

1925 births
1994 deaths
Italian footballers
Serie A players
Spezia Calcio players
S.S.D. Lucchese 1905 players
Torino F.C. players
U.S. Triestina Calcio 1918 players
Juventus F.C. players
Footballers from Turin
Association football midfielders